Skar or Skår may refer to:

Surnames
Alfred B. Skar (1896–1969), Norwegian journalist and politician
Hugo Mikal Skår (born 1978), Norwegian actor
Johannes Skar (1837–1914), Norwegian educator and folklorist
Julian Skar (born 1981), Norwegian composer and multi-media artist
Øystein Skar (born 1985), Norwegian pianist and composer
Rolf Skår (born 1941), Norwegian engineer
Reidar Skår (born 1964), Norwegian musician, composer and music producer
Sindre Bjørnestad Skar (born 1992) Norwegian cross-country skier

Other uses
Tibetan skar, historic unit of currency
 General Skarr, a character from Evil Con Carne
El Edén International Airport (ICAO airport code SKAR), airport in Armenia, Colombia 
SKAR, a fictional organization in the G.I. Joe Extreme toy series
Skår (district), in Örgryte, Sweden

See also
Scarr, a surname
Skaar (disambiguation)
Scar (disambiguation)

Norwegian-language surnames